The théâtre du Quartier latin is a former Parisian entertainment venue which was located 9 rue Champollion in the 5th arrondissement of Paris (Latin Quarter) and directed by Michel de Ré until 1956.

Repertoire
 1951 : Mi-figue, mi-raisin by Jean Tardieu, directed by Michel de Ré
 1951 : Treize pièces à louer 13 courtes pièces, directed by Michel de Ré (24 avril)
 Opéra biographique by François Billetdoux
 Le Grand Comédien by 
 Les Temps faciles by Steve Passeur
 La Postérité by 
 À la chasse comme à la chasse by François Billetdoux
 Les Erreurs by Jean Tardieu
 Oswald et Zenaïde by Jean Tardieu
 La Vue noire by 
 L'Ecole des femmes by Pierre Devaux
 Ce que parler veut dire by Jean Tardieu
 Incognito, songs by 
 Réflexion faite by Steve Passeur
 La Maison des confidences by Henri Duvernois   
 1951 : La Reine Mère ou les Valois terribles, opéra bouffe by Pierre Devaux, music Georges Van Parys (31 October)  
 1952 : L'Amour en papier by Louis Ducreux and Le Jardin du Roi by Pierre Devaux, directed by Michel de Ré (10 March)
 1953 : Sens interdit by Armand Salacrou,  Sisyphe et la Mort by Robert Merle and Les Amitiés dangereuses by Maurice Tillet and André Salvet, directed by Michel de Ré (9 January)
 1953 : Victims of Duty by Eugène Ionesco, directed by Jacques Mauclair (26 February)
 1953 : Musique pour sourds by Charles Spaak, 26 February
 1953 : Actes de grâce, show in three plays, directed by Michel de Ré (7 May)
 Les Aveux les plus doux by Georges Arnaud
 Fraternité by Fernand Fleuret and Georges Girard
 La Tête des autres by Marcel Aymé  
 1953 : La Reine Mère or Pas un mot à la Reine Mère, opéra-bouffe by Pierre Devaux, music Georges Van Parys
 1954 : La Bande à Bonnot by Henri-François Rey, directed by Michel de Ré (17 December)

External links 
Le théâtre du Quartier Latin sur Les Archives du spectacle

Quartier latin
Buildings and structures in the 5th arrondissement of Paris